Vino Veritas is a 2013 American independent dark comedy film directed by Sarah Knight and starring Carrie Preston.  It is based on David MacGregor's play of the same name.

Cast
Carrie Preston as Claire
Bernard White as Ridley
Brian Hutchison as Phil
Heather Raffo as Lauren

Plot 
On Halloween night, two couples meet at one of their houses for drinks and hors d'oeuvres before planning on heading out to a massive party.  Dressed in their finest costumes (witch, cowboy, doctor, and Queen Elizabeth I), the hostess brings out a bottle of blue wine she picked up in Peru.  Based on an old Inca recipe, the wine supposedly has truth-telling properties and is brewed from the skins of blue dart tree frogs.  Three of the four drink the wine and the conversation begins to take odd turns.  Some of the "truths" are harmless enough, but progressively get darker and more disturbing.  It gradually becomes clear that the marriage of one of the couples is disintegrating due to a lack of truthfulness, and the other marriage is only held together by lies.

Production
According to Preston, the film was shot in Lincoln, Nebraska the hometown of director Knight.

Reception
The film opened to positive reviews.  Mark Adams of Screen Daily wrote, “A smartly and slickly made indie drama, cleverly adapted by playwright David MacGregor from his own production and blessed with four fine performances. Director Sarah Knight keeps ‘Vino Veritas’ moving nicely, and makes good use of her interiors that help belie the film’s stagey origins.”  L. Kent Wolgamott of the Lincoln Journal Star penned, “‘Vino Veritas’ never feels ‘stagey.’ That’s a measure of the quality of MacGregor’s adaptation, Knight’s direction, John Beymer’s cinematography and the acting.”   Tom Long of Detroit News wrote, “It's highly entertaining if occasionally (and appropriately) cringe-inducing and offers some fine actors the opportunity to strut their stuff. And that's the truth, sans vino.”

References

External links
 
 

American comedy films
American independent films
American films based on plays
Films shot in Nebraska
2010s English-language films
2010s American films